The Verville-Packard R-1 Racer was a military racing aircraft that was modified from Alfred V. Verville's previous Verville VCP-1 design.  The R-1 is sometimes known also as the Verville-Packard VCP-R or the Verville-Packard 600.  The R-1 was the first racing aircraft built for the United States Army Air Corps.

Development
The first R-1 was created from a VCP-1 in 1919, by installing the Packard V-12 engine.

Operational history
On November 27, 1920, Capt. Corliss Moseley, flying an R-1 racer, out of 24 track finishers, won the Pulitzer Trophy Race at Mitchel Air Force Base.  The top speed was 156.54 mph.

Operators

United States Army Air Corps

Specifications (R-1)

See also

Notes

References

External links
 "Army Pilot Wins Pulitzer Air Race," The New York Times, Nov 26, 1920, Page 1, Column 6, Subtitle: "Lieutenant Mosley, in Verville Packard, Averages Almost Three Miles a Minute"
 ThisDayInAviation.com - Coverage of the R-1 Winning the Pulitzer Trophy in 1920

1920s United States military utility aircraft
Racing aircraft
Verville aircraft
Biplanes
Single-engined tractor aircraft
Aircraft first flown in 1919